Friedrich Richard Rudolf Schlechter (16 October 1872 – 16 November 1925) was a German taxonomist, botanist, and author of several works on orchids.

He went on botanical expeditions in Africa, Indonesia, New Guinea, South and Central America and Australia.

His vast herbarium was destroyed during the bombing of Berlin in 1945.

Early life 
Rudolf Schlechter was born on 16 October 1872 in Berlin, the third of six children.  His father Hugo Schlechter was a lithographer.  After finishing school at the Friedrich Wilhelm Gymnasium he started a horticulture education, first at the gardening market of Mrs. Bluth and then at the University of Berlin garden.  There he worked as an assistant till the autumn of 1891.

His brother was Max Schlechter (1874–1960), was a German trader and collector of natural history specimens.

Career
Rudolf Schlechter began his career of botanical fieldwork by leaving Europe in 1891 to journey to Africa and subsequently across Indonesia and Australia.  Throughout his career he has focused on expanding his research collection of orchids.  He was a leader of expeditions in German Africa, investigating the Caoutchouc industry, but continually collecting plant specimens.  He also lived extensively in German New Guinea in the first decade of the new century.  Before World War I he settled in Berlin, marrying his wife Alexandra Schlechter and becoming curator of Berlin's botanical garden in Dahlem.  He is estimated to have proposed one thousand new species in the family Orchidaceae alone.

Works
 Die Orchideen von Deutsch-Neu-Guinea, 1914
 Die Orchideen, ihre Beschreibung, Kultur und Züchtung, 1915
 Orchideologiae sino-japonicae prodromus, 1919
 Orchidaceae Powellianae Panamenses, 1922
 Die Orchideenflora der südamerikanischen Kordillerenstaaten (written with Rudolf Mansfeld), 1919–1929
 Monographie und Iconographie der Orchideen Europas und des Mittelmeergebietes (written with G. Keller), 1925–1943
 Blütenanalysen neuer Orchideen (published by R. Mansfeld), 1930–1934

Honours
Several genera of plants have been named in his honour, Schlechterella (in the Apocynaceae family),Schlechterina (in the Passifloraceae family), and also Rudolfiella , (in the Orchidaceae family).

References

20th-century German botanists
Orchidologists
1872 births
1925 deaths
Botanists active in Africa
Botanists active in the Pacific
Botanists active in Australia
Botanists active in South America
Botanists active in Central America
Botanists with author abbreviations
19th-century German botanists
Scientists from Berlin